Gennadi Veniaminovich Parovin (born 18 January 1965) is a former Russian professional footballer.

Club career
He made his professional debut in the Soviet Second League in 1982 for FC Rostselmash Rostov-on-Don.

References

1965 births
Living people
Soviet footballers
Russian footballers
Association football defenders
FC Rostov players
FC SKA Rostov-on-Don players
FC APK Morozovsk players
Bajai LSE footballers
FC Zhemchuzhina Sochi players
FC Kuban Krasnodar players
Soviet Top League players
Russian Premier League players
Russian expatriate footballers
Expatriate footballers in Hungary